Haji Naim Brahim (born 23 April 1948) is an international lawn bowler from Brunei.

Bowls career

Commonwealth Games
Brahim has represented Brunei at six Commonwealth Games; he participated in the singles at the 1994 Commonwealth Games, the pairs at the 1998 Commonwealth Games and the 2002 Commonwealth Games, the singles at the 2006 Commonwealth Games, the pairs at the 2000 Commonwealth Games and the triples event and fours event at the 2018 Commonwealth Games.

World Championships
Brahim has been selected to represent Brunei at the World Bowls Championship on three occasions in 2008 (singles and pairs), 2012 (triples and fours) and 2016 (triples and fours).

Southeast Asian Games
He has also won two gold medals in Lawn bowls at the Southeast Asian Games (2005 and 2007) and ten years later won a silver medal in the triples at the 2017 Southeast Asian Games.

Asian Championships
He has won two gold medals at the Asian Lawn Bowls Championship.

References

External links
 
 
 

Living people
1948 births
Bruneian bowls players
Southeast Asian Games medalists for Brunei
Southeast Asian Games medalists in lawn bowls
Competitors at the 1999 Southeast Asian Games
Competitors at the 2001 Southeast Asian Games
Competitors at the 2005 Southeast Asian Games
Competitors at the 2007 Southeast Asian Games
Competitors at the 2017 Southeast Asian Games
Bowls players at the 1994 Commonwealth Games
Bowls players at the 1998 Commonwealth Games
Bowls players at the 2002 Commonwealth Games
Bowls players at the 2006 Commonwealth Games
Bowls players at the 2010 Commonwealth Games
Bowls players at the 2018 Commonwealth Games